The Yearling is a 1946 American Family Western film directed by Clarence Brown, produced by Sidney Franklin, and released  by Metro-Goldwyn-Mayer (MGM). The screenplay by Paul Osborn and John Lee Mahin (uncredited) was adapted from Marjorie Kinnan Rawlings's 1938 novel of the same name. The film stars Gregory Peck, Jane Wyman, Claude Jarman Jr., Chill Wills, and Forrest Tucker.

The story is about a young boy who adopts a trouble-making young deer. The story was later adapted as the 1994 TV film The Yearling starring Peter Strauss and Jean Smart.

Plot 

Ezra "Penny" Baxter, once a Confederate soldier, and his wife Ora, are pioneer farmers near Lake George, Florida in 1878. Their son, Jody, a boy in his pre-teen years, is their only surviving child. Jody has a wonderful relationship with his warm and loving father. Ora, however, is still haunted by the deaths of the other children of the family she had lost over the years. She is very sombre and is afraid that Jody will end up dying if she shows her parental love to him. Jody finds her somewhat unloving and unreasonable.

With all of his siblings dead and buried, Jody longs for a pet to play with and care for. Penny is sympathetic and understanding, but Ora is disgusted and believes that a pet is nothing but trouble. One morning, Jody and his parents discover that their old enemy, a bear named Old Slewfoot, has returned and killed a calf and young pig from among their stock. They set out after the bear, accompanied by Penny's dogs Perk, Rip, and Julia. They catch up with the bear, but Old Slewfoot is able to escape after Perk flees from the bear fight in terror, Penny's gun backfires, and Julia is badly injured. Upset over his best hunting dog injured from the fight, his gun useless, and his new dog Perk useless as a hunting dog, Penny decides to trade in Perk for a new gun with his neighbors, the Forresters. Jody becomes acquainted with Fodderwing, who is the youngest of the Forresters and keeps a menagerie of pets, and the two become fast friends. Lem Forrester trades Penny a new shotgun in exchange for the mongrel Perk.

One day, as Penny and Jody are tracking down their missing hogs that had been stolen by the Forresters, a rattlesnake bites Penny before he kills it with his new gun. Penny kills a doe and uses its liver to draw out the venom. Jody asks to adopt the doe's orphaned fawn. Penny permits it but warns Jody that the fawn will have to be set free when it grows up.

When Jody goes to ask his only friend, Fodderwing, to name the fawn, Jody finds out that Fodderwing has just died. However, Buck Forrester tells Jody that Fodderwing had said that if he had a fawn he would name him Flag because of its white tail. Jody and his family attend Fodderwing's funeral, and at a generous request from the Forresters, Penny offers a eulogy about Fodderwing's kindness and wisdom with the wild animals and says that in the House of the Lord Fodderwing will be healed of his crippled body, walking around as easily as anyone else.

As the months pass, Jody and Flag are inseparable. One year later (now a "yearling"), Flag has grown up and become a nuisance to the household and farm; he eats newly-grown corn, destroys fences, and tramples on tobacco crops. After Penny is injured while trying to clear another field to make up for lost crops, Penny tells Jody that he and his mother have agreed that for Jody to keep Flag he must replant corn and build the fence around the field higher. Jody works hard and even receives help from Ora with the fence, but during the night, Flag manages to jump the new fence and destroys the new corn crop. Penny orders Jody to take the deer out into the woods and shoot it. Jody takes Flag out but does not have the heart to kill it.  He orders the deer to go away and never return, but Flag comes back to their property and again devours the crop. Ora (whom Jody believes had always hated his pet) shoots Flag with a double-barreled shotgun, discharging one of the barrels but only wounding the deer. Penny orders Jody to put the deer out of its "torment". Rather than let his pet deer suffer an agonizing death, he follows his father's orders and kills Flag with the remaining shell.

The loss of Jody's beloved pet deer proves too much for him to handle: overwhelmed with anger and despair, he runs away from home. Three days later, he is rescued, unconscious and adrift on the river in a canoe, by a friendly boat captain and returns home. He and Penny quickly reconcile, but Ora is still out searching for him. Just before Jody goes to bed, Ora returns and sees that he is back. She becomes filled with happiness and emotion, knowing that her huge fear of losing her last child is now over. She happily runs into Jody's room and showers him with more affection than she has before. She is no longer afraid to show her maternal love to him.

Cast

Production 

The Yearling was filmed on location in the Juniper Prairie Wilderness in the Ocala National Forest in Florida. A hiking trail in the area, "The Yearling Trail", is named after the story, and gives access to sites where the family lived whose stories inspired the novel.

MGM originally began production on The Yearling in 1941, with Spencer Tracy set to star as the patriarch, and with Victor Fleming chosen to direct. The studio also hired Marjorie Kinnan Rawlings, the author of the novel The Yearling, as a consultant and location scout. Rawlings marked a forest service map with locations for filming, specifically referencing the clearing she named "Baxter's Island." MGM moved to the filming location, renovated the cabin, and built surrounding buildings to create a town for a set. Once the actors arrived on location, a combination of the bugs, heat, and lack of enthusiasm for the plot made the actors leave. This led to the film being shelved after only three weeks of location shooting in Florida. (According to biographer Millicent Bell, famed novelist John P. Marquand was visiting MGM in 1941 and asked to sit in on a "Yearling" production meeting. He was amused to find that he was the only person in the meeting who had read the book.)

Production was resumed in 1945, after Clarence Brown was hired as the new director. Brown cast Gregory Peck to play Pa, Jane Wyman to play Ma, and after a long search, cast Claude Jarman Jr. to play Jody. Due to Brown's drive for perfection, the average take number for scenes was between 20–21. He also got real hunting dogs to film the bear fight scene after deciding the original city dogs were not good enough. Peck received the second of his five Oscar nominations for The Yearling, his fifth film.

Music 
Herbert Stothart made arrangements of Frederick Delius's music, particularly Appalachia: Variations on an Old Slave Song, for the film. In 2006 Film Score Monthly released the majority of the film's original score alongside Stothart's score for Random Harvest (1942) in the CD collection Random Harvest/The Yearling (1942/1946) limited to 3000 copies. Liner notes for both scores were provided by Marilee Bradford.

Track listing for The Yearling
 Opening Title/Foreword/April 1878 – 6:31
 Addenda to Feelin' the Sun – 0:39
 Crippled Boy – 1:07
 Birds and Angels – 1:35
 A Farmer Comes to Town – 1:32
 What Happened to You – 1:15
 Material for a New Dress – 0:34
 Obliged to Make It – 2:26
 It's Me! Jody! – 3:15
 To Find a Name – 4:33
 Thy Will Be Done – 1:13
 The Sun – 1:00
 Little Farmer – 2:08
 Ma, I'm Hungry – 2:28
 Mother & End Title (alternate version)/Addendum – 2:47

Bonus tracks
 Title Fanfare/Opening Title (instrumental)/Foreword (long version) – 2:19
 Fawn Ballet Chorus Addenda – 1:43
 Thy Will Be Done (alternate mix) – 1:15
 Hungry (insert – revised vocal) – 0:44
 Mother & End Title (alternate fragments) – 0:49

Total Time: 40:43

Reception 
Jac. D. Grant of the Hollywood Reporter wrote, it provides "an emotional experience seldom equaled." It's been described as "a huge success" and "a remarkable film that truly is for the entire family" by TV Guide; Variety said it is a "heart-warming story", that its "underlying power is impressive," and that "the underplaying is sometimes too static, but just as interest lags, the director injects another highlight."

The film earned $4,768,000, in the US and Canada and $2,831,000 elsewhere, making it MGM's most successful movie of the year. However, because of its high production cost, profits were only $451,000. Since the release of The Yearling, films with similar themes have been released including Old Yeller and Kes.

Awards and nominations

Home media 
The Yearling was released for the first time on DVD by Warner Home Video on September 3, 2002. It was later re-issued as part of the Warner Archive Collection, a second DVD edition was released on June 24, 2014 and the Blu-ray edition was released on May 11, 2021.

Adaptations 
The Yearling was presented as a one-hour radio adaptation on Lux Radio Theatre on January 19, 1948, with Gregory Peck and Jane Wyman reprising their screen roles. It was also presented on Stars in the Air on February 7, 1952. This 30-minute radio adaptation starred Gregory Peck and Jean Hagen.

, also known in English as Fortunate Fawn, is a Japanese anime series from 1983, broadcast on NHK G in Japan.

The Yearling (1994) was a made-for-television remake of The Yearling, broadcast on CBS in the United States.

References

External links 

 
 
 
 
 
 

1946 films
1946 drama films
American children's drama films
American Western (genre) films
1946 Western (genre) films
1940s English-language films
Films scored by Herbert Stothart
Films about animals
Films about deer and moose
Films based on children's books
Films directed by Clarence Brown
Films set in the 1860s
Films set in the 1870s
Films set in Florida
Films shot in Florida
Films whose art director won the Best Art Direction Academy Award
Films whose cinematographer won the Best Cinematography Academy Award
Films featuring a Best Drama Actor Golden Globe winning performance
Metro-Goldwyn-Mayer films
1940s children's films
1940s American films